The Protestant Church in the Netherlands (abbreviated PKN) is the largest Protestant denomination in the Netherlands, being both Calvinist and Lutheran.

It was founded on 1 May 2004 as the merger of the vast majority of the Dutch Reformed Church, the vast majority of the Reformed Churches in the Netherlands, and the Evangelical Lutheran Church in the Kingdom of the Netherlands.  The merger was the culmination of an organizational process started in 1961. Several orthodox Reformed and liberal churches did not merge into the new church.

The Protestant Church in the Netherlands (PKN) forms the country's second largest Christian denomination after the Catholic Church, with approximately 1.6 million members as per the church official statistics or some 9.1% of the population in 2016. It is the traditional faith of the Dutch Royal Family – a remnant of  historical dominance of the Dutch Reformed Church, the main predecessor of the Protestant Church.

Doctrine and practice

The doctrine of the Protestant Church in the Netherlands is expressed in its creeds. In addition to holding the Apostles', the Nicene and the Athanasian Creeds of the universal church, it also holds to the confessions of its predecessor bodies. From the Lutheran tradition are the unaltered Augsburg Confession and Luther's Catechism, and from the Calvinist tradition are the Heidelberg and Genevan Catechisms along with the Belgic Confession with the Canons of Dordt. The Church also acknowledges the Theological Declaration of Barmen and the Leuenberg Agreement. Ordination of women and blessings of same-sex marriages are allowed.

The PKN contains both liberal and conservative movements, although the liberal Remonstrants left talks when they could not agree with the unaltered adoption of the Canons of Dordt. Local congregations have far-reaching powers concerning "controversial" matters (such as admittance to holy communion or whether women are admitted as members of the congregation's consistory).

Organization
The polity of the Protestant Church in the Netherlands is a hybrid of presbyterian and congregationalist church governance. Church governance is organised along local, regional, and national lines. At the local level is the congregation. An individual congregation is led by a church council made of the minister along with elders and deacons elected by the congregation. At the regional level were 75 classical assemblies whose members are chosen by the church councils. As of May 1, 2018, these 75 classical assemblies are reorganized into 11 larger ones. At the national level is the General Synod which directs areas of common interest, such as theological education, ministry training and ecumenical cooperation.

The PKN has four different types of congregations:
 Protestant congregations: local congregations from different church bodies that have merged
 Dutch Reformed congregations
 Reformed congregations (congregations of the former Reformed Churches in the Netherlands)
 Lutheran congregations (congregations of the former Evangelical-Lutheran Church)

Lutherans are a minority (about 1 percent) of the PKN's membership. To ensure that Lutherans are represented in the Church, the Lutheran congregations have their own synod. The Lutheran Synod also has representatives in the General Synod.

Statistical details
The Protestant Church in the Netherlands issues yearly reports regarding its membership and finances.

Its make-up by former affiliation of its congregations was as follows in 2017:

Trend shows that since 2011 identification with former denominations has been falling in favor of simply identifying as "Protestant".

Secularization
Secularization, or the decline in religiosity, first became noticeable after 1960 in the Protestant rural areas of Friesland and Groningen. Then, it spread to Amsterdam, Rotterdam, and the other large cities in the west. Finally, the southern Catholic areas showed religious declines. 
Research in 2007 concluded that 42% of the members of the PKN were non-theists. Furthermore, in the PKN and several other smaller denominations of the Netherlands, one in six clergy were either agnostic or atheist. A Dutch minister of the PKN, Klaas Hendrikse once described God as "a word for experience, or human experience" and said that Jesus may have never existed.

A countervailing trend is produced by a religious revival in the Dutch Bible Belt, and the growth of Muslim and Hindu communities resulting from immigration and high birth rates.

Separations

Only those congregations belonging to the former Reformed Churches in the Netherlands have the legal right to secede from the PKN without losing its property and church during a transition period of 10 years. Seven congregations have so far decided to form the Continued Reformed Churches in the Netherlands. Two congregations have joined one of the other smaller Calvinist churches in the Netherlands. Some minorities within congregations that joined the PKN decided to leave the church and associated themselves individually with one of the other Reformed churches.

Some congregations and members in the Dutch Reformed Church did not agree with the merger and have separated. They have organized themselves in the Restored Reformed Church. Estimations of their membership vary from 35,000 up to 70,000 people in about 120 local congregations. They disagree with the pluralism of the merged church which maintains, as they see it, contradicting Calvinist and Lutheran confessions. This group also considers same-sex marriages and female clergy unbiblical.

Involvement in the Middle East
In a meeting of eight Jewish and eight Protestant Dutch leaders in Israel in May 2011, a statement of cooperation was issued, indicating, for the most part, that the Protestant Church recognizes the issues involved with the Palestinian Christians and that this is sometimes at odds with support for the State of Israel, but standing up for the rights of the Palestinians does not detract from the emphasis on the safety of the State of Israel and vice versa.

See also
 Bible Belt (Netherlands)
 History of religion in the Netherlands
 United and uniting churches
 Religion in the Netherlands
 Reformed Association in the Protestant Church in the Netherlands

References

External links
 (in Dutch)

 
Calvinism in the Netherlands
Christian denominations in the Netherlands
Dutch Reformed Church
Lutheran World Federation members
Lutheranism in the Netherlands
Protestant denominations established in the 21st century
Reformed denominations in the Netherlands
Netherlands
United and uniting churches
Christian organizations established in 2004
2004 establishments in the Netherlands